Emich Kyrill, Prince of Leiningen (18 October 192630 October 1991) was a German entrepreneur and son of Karl, Prince of Leiningen. He was the 7th Prince of Leiningen from 1946 until his death.

Early life
Emich was born at Coburg, Weimar Republic, the first child of Karl, Prince of Leiningen (1898–1946), (son of Emich, 5th Prince of Leiningen and Princess Feodore of Hohenlohe-Langenburg) and his wife, Grand Duchess Maria Kirillovna of Russia (1907–1951), (daughter of Grand Duke Kirill Vladimirovich of Russia and Princess Victoria Melita of Edinburgh). Through his mother, he was a descendant of Queen Victoria and Tsar Alexander II. Through his father, he was a descendant of the Vasa kings of Sweden and of both of Queen Victoria's half-siblings, Carl, Prince of Leiningen and Feodora, Princess of Hohenlohe-Langenburg. As a result, Emich was the first descendant of all three of Princess Victoria of Saxe-Coburg-Saalfeld's children.

Marriage
Emich married on 10 August 1950 in Rastede to Duchess Eilika of Oldenburg (2 February 192826 January 2016), fourth child and second daughter of Nikolaus, Hereditary Grand Duke of Oldenburg and his wife, Princess Helena of Waldeck and Pyrmont.

They had four children:
Princess Melita Elisabeth Bathildis Helene Margarita of Leiningen (b. 19 June 1951) married Horst Legrum on 14 April 1978. 
Prince Karl Emich of Leiningen (b. 12 June 1952) married Princess Margarita of Hohenlohe-Öhringen on 8 June 1984. They have one daughter. He remarried Gabriele Thyssen on 24 May 1991 and they were divorced in 1998. They have one daughter. He remarried, again, Countess Isabelle von und zu Egloffstein  on 7 June 2008. They have one son. 
Andreas, Prince of Leiningen (b. 27 November 1955), married Princess Alexandra of Hanover on 5 October 1981. They have three children. 
Princess Stephanie Margarita of Leiningen (1 October 1958 - 23 September 2017)

Prince of Leiningen
On the death of his father in 1946, Emich became the titular Prince of Leiningen.

A businessman and entrepreneur, he owned a 1955 Mercedes-Benz 300SL Gullwing Coupe Chassis.

The Prince fell out with his eldest son over the latter's marriage, and disinherited him.

He died on 30 October 1991, and was succeeded by his son Andreas.

Ancestry

References

Notes and sources
thePeerage.com — Emich Cyril Ferdinand Hermann VII Fürst zu Leiningen
Queen Victoria's Descendants, New York, 1987, Eilers, Marlene A., Reference: 195
Genealogisches Handbuch des Adels, Fürstliche Häuser, Reference: 1997

1926 births
1991 deaths
People from Coburg
Leiningen family
Princes of Leiningen